

Explorations
First expedition to Sub Marine Explorer in the Pearl Islands by James P. Delgado.

Excavations
March – Part of the podium of the Temple of Apollo in Mdina, Malta is discovered and subsequently excavated.

Finds
 February – Remains of oldest known European early modern humans at this time found in Peștera cu Oase, Romania.
 May 1 – Horncastle boar's head, an early 7th-century Anglo-Saxon ornament, probably part of a helmet crest, discovered in the eastern English town of Horncastle by a metal detectorist.
 May 3 – Amesbury Archer, a Bronze Age burial found near Stonehenge in England.
 June – Newport Ship (medieval) in south-east Wales.
 October – Banc Ty'nddôl sun-disc in mid-Wales.
 3,500-year-old human remains found in the Citadel of Damascus.
 Mask of la Roche-Cotard (Mousterian) found beside the Loire in France.

Publications
 Thebes tablets.

Events
 Brief reappearance and study of Seaton Carew Wreck.
 Ciampate del Diavolo (early hominid footprints in Italy) come to scientific attention.
 December 29 – 70,000 excavated artifacts from the Ōfune Site in Japan are damaged or destroyed when fire breaks out in an exhibition room.

Deaths
 March 31 – Carlos J. Gradin, Argentine archaeologist (born 1918)
 April 28 – Gordon Willey, American archaeologist (born 1913)
 June 26 – Barbara Adams, English Egyptologist (born 1945)

See also
 Syria - ongoing excavations.

References

Archaeology by year
Archaeology